This is a list of the butterflies of China belonging to the family Riodinidae and an index to the species articles. This forms part of the full list of butterflies of China.

Riodinidae
genus: Abisara
Abisara fylla fylla (Westwood, [1851])  
Abisara chelina chelina (Fruhstorfer, [1904]) 
Abisara freda  Bennett, 1957 
Abisara fylloides  (Moore, 1902) West China
Abisara neophron  (Hewitson, 1861)
A. n. neophron  Tibet
Abisara burnii  (de Nicéville, 1895)
A. b. assus  Fruhstorfer  South China
Abisara echerius  (Stoll, [1790])
A. e. lisa  Bennet Hainan
Abisara saturata  (Moore, 1878)
A. s. saturata  Hainan
Abisara abnormis  Moore, [1884]
genus: Dodona
Dodona eugenes  (Guerin, 1843)
Dodona egeon  (Westwood, 1851)
Dodona dipoea  (Hewitson, 1865)
Dodona adonira  (Hewitson, 1865)
Dodona durga  (Kollar & Redtenbacher, 1844) 
Dodona ouida  (Hewitson, 1865)
Dodona deodata  Hewitson, 1876 
Dodona henrici  (Guerin, 1843) 
Dodona kaolinkon  Yoshino, 1999 West Yunnan
Dodona maculosa  Leech, 1890 
Dodona hoenei  Forster 1951 North Yunnan, Likiang.
genus: Paralaxita
Paralaxita dora  (Fruhstorfer, 1904)
P. d. hainana  (Riley & Godfrey, 1925)
genus: Polycaena
Polycaena princeps  (Oberthür, 1886) 
Polycaena lama  Leech, 1893 
Polycaena chauchowensis  (Mell, 1923)
Polycaena carmelita  Oberthür, 1903 
Polycaena lua  Grum-Grshimailo, [1891] 
Polycaena matuta  Leech, [1893]
Polycaena kansuensis  (Nordström, 1935) 
Polycaena yunnana  Sugiyama, 1997 
Polycaena aestivalis  Oberthür 1903 
genus: Stiboges
Stiboges nymphidia  Butler, 1876 
S. n. elodinia  Fruhstorfer, 1914 China
genus: Zemeros
Zemeros flegyas  (Cramer, [1780]) 
Z. f. flegyas Yunnan
Z. f. confucius  (Moore, 1878) Hainan

References

Chou, I0 (ed) 1994. Monographia Rhopalocerorum Sinensium (Monograph of Chinese Butterflies). Henan Scientific and Technological Publishing House, Zhengzhou. (in Chinese). . Lists species plus new distribution records for China. New species descriptions are noted in English. Colour photographs of the species treated, with accompanying Chinese text.
Full list references.

External links
Catalogue of life China List provided by Chinese Academy of Sciences online here
Butterflies of China at Digital moths of Japan. Includes images.
Wikispecies taxonomy additional references via species or genus
Acta Zootaxonomica Sinica

Lists of butterflies of China